Olofström, previously Holje by, is a locality in Blekinge County, Sweden with 7,327 inhabitants in 2010.
in 1967, the market town of Olofström was merged with the villages Kyrkhult and Jämshög to create Olofström Municipality. Olofström is the seat of Olofström Municipality.
The increased use of cars in the 1950s and 1960s was the great boost for the municipality. Today the automobile industry, dominated by Volvo Cars, is the largest employer in Olofström.

Olofström  Church  
Olofström  church (Olofströms kyrka) belongs to Jämshög's parish in the Diocese of Lund. The original building is a chapel built in 1933. A rebuild was completed in 1962 under the guidance of architects Hanna and Roy Victorson in Karlshamn. The entrance hall and the parish hall's northwest wing were built in 1986 under the direction of architectural firm  K.E. Dudzik.

Education
The gymnasium accommodates one of the few orienteering schools in Sweden, as well as the only archery school in Sweden.

Sports

Olofström is home to football club Olofströms IF.

Natives from Olofström
 Jan Gunnarsson - (born May 30, 1962), professional tennis player
 Magnus Larsson - another famous, professional tennis player

See also
Volvo Cars

References

External links 

Municipal seats of Blekinge County
Swedish municipal seats
Populated places in Olofström Municipality
Market towns in Sweden